Robyn Stapleton is a Scottish singer who performs traditional songs in English, Scots, and Gaelic. She studied music at the Royal Conservatoire of Scotland and the University of Limerick in Ireland. In 2014, Robyn won the BBC Radio Scotland Young Traditional Musician award and was nominated for Scots Singer of the Year at that year's Scots Trad Music Awards.

Discography
Fickle Fortune (1 June 2015)
The Songs of Robert Burns (20 January 2017)

References

External links
Official website

Scottish folk singers
20th-century Scottish women singers
Living people
Year of birth missing (living people)